Joshua or Josh Webb may refer to:

Josh Webb (Home and Away), a recurring character in Home and Away
Josh Webb (footballer) (born 1995), English footballer (Kilmarnock FC)
Joshua Webb (basketball), Filipino basketball player (2013 PBA draft)